Akhmetovo (Äxmät) is a rural locality (a village) in Kirdasovsky Selsoviet, Abzelilovsky District, Bashkortostan, Russia. The population was 145 as of 2010. There are 3 streets.

Geography 
Akhmetovo is located 31 km southwest of Askarovo (the district's administrative centre) by road. Kirdasovo is the nearest rural locality.

References 

Rural localities in Abzelilovsky District